So Much in Love is the debut studio album by the American doo-wop group The Tymes. It peaked at number 15 on the Billboard Top LPs chart in 1963.

Track listing

Side one
"Alone" – 2:33
"My Summer Love" – 2:41
"Wonderful! Wonderful!" – 3:01
"That Old Black Magic" – 2:37
"Let's Make Love Tonight" – 2:14
"Goodnight My Love" - 2:05

Side two
"So Much in Love" – 2:18
"You Asked Me to Be Yours" – 2:22
"The Twelfth of Never" – 2:30
"Way Beyond Today" – 2:25
"Summer Day" – 2:40
"Autumn Leaves - 2:18

Charts

References

1963 debut albums